Christopher Auth from the Intel Corporation of Hillsboro, Oregon, was named Fellow of the Institute of Electrical and Electronics Engineers (IEEE) in 2015 for contributions to strained silicon transistor technology.

References

20th-century births
Living people
Fellow Members of the IEEE
Intel people
Year of birth missing (living people)
Place of birth missing (living people)
American electrical engineers